Eesho is an Indian Malayalam-language drama thriller film film directed by Nadirshah featuring Jayasurya and Namitha Pramod in the lead roles. The film written by Suneesh Varanad is produced by Arun Narayan. Roby Varghese is the cinematographer while Nadirshah composes the songs and the original background score is composed and produced by Rahul Raj.
The film released on 5 October 2022 through SonyLIV OTT platform.

Plot
While working the night at an ATM, a security guard, Ramachandran Pillai who is the prime witness in the case against a powerful industrialist, Sevichan happens across a mysterious man named Eesho. They engage in a conversation and the guard pours his heart out to the stranger before realising that Eesho may not be a friend. Who is Eesho and what does he want? Turns out Eesho is a hitman and turns for the rest of the plot.

Cast
 
 Jayasurya as Shivan/Eesho
 Jaffar Idukki as Ramachandran Pillai 
 Namitha Pramod as Advocate Aswathy
 Suresh Krishna as Sevichan
 Johny Antony as Advocate Sebastian Aduppukkunnel
 Akshara Kishor as Shivani, Shivan's daughter
 Yadhu Krishnan as Viswambaran
 Manikandan R. Achari as Ambi Sura
 Srikant Murali as Joseph
 Indrans as Varghese
 Kottayam Nazeer as Salim
 Rajith Kumar as Raveendran
 Mohan Jose as Jamal
 Jayakumar Parameswaran Pillai as driver
 V. K. Baiju as S. I. Michale
 Sindhu Varma as councellor
 Arun Narayan as Sethu
 Samadh Sulaiman as Alex
 Eloor George as Alex's relative
 Nandu Poduval as Shivan's coworker
 Adinad Sasi as Krishnankutty
 Priyanka Anoop as Teashop owner 
 Nadirshah as a passenger in the bus (cameo appearance)
 Rajini Chandy as the court judge (cameo appearance)

Marketing 
The first look motion poster of the film was released by Mammootty through his official Facebook account on 15 May 2021. Later on 5 August 2021 second look poster of the movie was released. The teaser of the movie was released on 3 April 2022.

Release 
The film will have a direct direct-to-video release through the SonyLIV OTT platform on 5 October 2022.

Controversy
The film was briefly embroiled in controversy over its title which is the Malayalam name of Jesus. The Kerala High Court eventually dismissed the plea to stay the release of the film.

References

External links

Eesho Review

2022 films
2020s Malayalam-language films
Indian thriller films
Films shot in Kerala
Indian direct-to-video films
2022 direct-to-video films
SonyLIV original films
Films directed by Nadirshah
Films scored by Nadirshah